Dave Chartier (born February 15, 1961) is a Canadian former professional ice hockey player.

Born in St. Lazare, Manitoba, Chartier was drafted 191st overall by the Winnipeg Jets in the 1980 NHL Entry Draft from the Brandon Wheat Kings.

During the 1981–82 season, he was called up for one game for the Jets and one game for the Central Hockey League's Tulsa Oilers where he scored one goal and also featured in the Oilers' playoff run that season.  Another season in Tulsa followed before a two-year spell in the American Hockey League with the Sherbrooke Jets.  At the end of the 1983–84 season, the 23-year-old Chartier retired from hockey.

Career statistics

Regular season and playoffs

See also
 List of players who played only one game in the NHL

External links
 

1961 births
Living people
Brandon Travellers players
Brandon Wheat Kings players
Canadian expatriate ice hockey players in the United States
Canadian ice hockey centres
Ice hockey people from Manitoba
Sherbrooke Jets players
Tulsa Oilers (1964–1984) players
Winnipeg Jets (1979–1996) draft picks
Winnipeg Jets (1979–1996) players